Navarretia rosulata is a rare species of flowering plant in the phlox family known by the common names San Anselmo navarretia, Marin County navarretia, and Marin County pincushionplant.

Distribution
The plant is endemic to California, where it is known from only about 20 occurrences in Marin and Napa Counties.

It is endemic to rocky serpentine soils.

Conservation
The plant is an Endangered species on the California Native Plant Society Inventory of Rare and Endangered Plants.

Description
It has a skunky scent. The leaves are divided into many linear lobes.

The inflorescence is a cluster of many flowers surrounded by leaflike bracts and hairy, glandular sepals. The bloom period is May to July.

Taxonomy
This plant was considered a subspecies of Navarretia heterodoxa (Navarretia heterodoxa ssp. rosulata) until 1993, when it was separated and named a distinct species.

References

External links
Calflora Database: Navarretia rosulata (San Anselmo navarretia, Marin County navarretia)
Jepson Manual eFlora (TJM2) treatment of Navarretia rosulata
UC CalPhotos gallery

rosulata
Endemic flora of California
Natural history of the California chaparral and woodlands
Natural history of the California Coast Ranges
Natural history of Marin County, California
Natural history of Napa County, California